Quintette is an unincorporated community in El Dorado County, California.

A post office operated at Quintette from 1903 to 1912, with a move in 1906.

References

Unincorporated communities in California
Unincorporated communities in El Dorado County, California